Vibe (real name Paco Ramone or Francisco "Cisco" Ramon) is a fictional superhero appearing in American comic books published by DC Comics.

Carlos Valdes portrays Cisco Ramon in The CW's Arrowverse.

Publication history
Vibe's first appearance was in Justice League of America Annual #2 (October 1984), and he was created by Gerry Conway and Chuck Patton.

Fictional character biography
Cisco Ramon began his career as Vibe shortly after Aquaman disbanded the original Justice League. When young Cisco heard that a new Justice League was forming in his own hometown Detroit, he decided to give up his position as the leader of a local street gang, Los Lobos, to join. What made Cisco a candidate was his metahuman ability to emit powerful vibratory shock waves.

Vibe's presence on the team caused Aquaman and the Martian Manhunter to harbor some strong doubts about the new JLA, particularly after he got the League involved in a rumble with a rival gang. Vibe soon proved his mettle during the League's battles against Cadre, Anton Allegro and Amazo. He stayed with the League through the Crisis on Infinite Earths crossover, when his powers played a vital role in defeating Despero.

During Darkseid's assault on Earth during the Legends mini-series, the Justice League of America was disbanded and Cisco left his JLA comrades to seek the familiar solace of the streets. Vibe was attacked by one of Professor Ivo's androids, and  became the first Justice League member to be killed in the line of duty. The Martian Manhunter brought Vibe's body back to the League's mountain sanctuary, where Vibe was laid to rest in a cryogenic chamber. Cisco's dead form has twice been resurrected by evil-doers.

He has two brothers, Armando and Dante; the former has a similar set of vibratory powers. 

In the Trinity maxi-series, reality is altered, and Cisco is living and shown as a member of The League, an underground version of the Justice League. Soon after Superman, Batman and Wonder Woman return, his head is disintegrated by an energy blast, killing him again.

In a Justice League of America tie-in to the "Blackest Night" storyline, Vibe was reanimated as a member of the Black Lantern Corps, rising from his coffin in the Hall of Justice. Alongside the Black Lantern Steel, Vibe attacked his former teammates, Gypsy and Vixen, until Doctor Light destroyed him.

The New 52
In DC's Free Comic Book Day 2012 sample during The New 52, a gatefold revealed various characters who would make an appearance in Justice League over the coming year, one of which was Vibe. Geoff Johns revealed that Vibe's return would be explored in greater detail in the third story arc of Justice League. On August 26, 2012, DC announced a new Justice League of America title which would feature Vibe. On November 5, 2012, DC announced that Vibe would star in his own ongoing monthly title. It was written by Andrew Kreisberg and drawn by Pete Woods and debuted in February 2013. In new continuity, Vibe's powers derive from being "caught in the event horizon of a Boom Tube", in which "interdimensional forces rewrote his DNA". Justice League of America's Vibe lasted for ten issues, with the final issue released on December 18, 2013.

Powers and abilities
As his name suggests, Vibe's powers revolve around vibration, frequency, and resonance. His powers enabled him to create shock waves of considerable strength that could shatter concrete or steel as well as affect the physical world as seismic vibrations (and even earth manipulation) or the fabric of spacetime (interdimensional, transdimensional and extradimensional portals).

Vibe's reintroduction in 2013 redefined his powers as having to do with interdimensional physics. Vibe's waves have the power to disrupt the Speed Force, making him one of the few characters who poses a serious threat to the Flash. For this reason, Steve Trevor recruits him into the JLA, which exists to guard against the threat of the main Justice League going rogue.

Amanda Waller says that "Cisco Ramon might be one of the most powerful super-humans on the planet. He wields vibrational powers that could in theory shake the Earth apart. And he's the only person we know of who can find and track inter-dimensional breaches." He is also undetectable by security cameras.

In addition, his agility is above average (and he was a super breakdancer). Under Batman's secret tutelage, Vibe became a more skilled combatant.

In the 2014 series The Flash, Vibe's powers first manifested as precognitive/retrocognitive visions brought-on by touch or by a strong-enough imprint. In time, he developed his powers to the point where he can produce focused waves of concussive, vibrational force and interdimensional breaches.

In other media

Television
 Vibe makes non-speaking appearances in Justice League Unlimited as a member of an expanded Justice League.
 Vibe appears in the DC Nation Shorts two-part short "Enter: Extremo", voiced by Carlos Alazraqui.
 Vibe makes non-speaking appearances in Teen Titans Go!.
 Cisco Ramon appears in Young Justice, voiced by Jacob Vargas. This version is a high school student at Hayward High School and classmate of Victor Stone.
 Vibe makes a non-speaking cameo appearance in the Harley Quinn episode "Something Borrowed, Something Green" as a member of the Justice League.

Arrowverse

Cisco Ramon appears in media set in the Arrowverse, portrayed by Carlos Valdes.
 First appearing in the live-action TV series Arrow episode "The Man Under the Hood" and primarily appearing in the live-action TV series The Flash, this version is an initially human mechanical engineer at S.T.A.R. Labs in Central City who assists Barry Allen / Flash in his crime-fighting efforts alongside Caitlin Snow. Following the explosion of Harrison Wells' particle accelerator, Ramon suffers a delayed reaction and eventually becomes a metahuman with sonic manipulation capabilities, tactile remote viewing, and the ability to detect anomalies within reality. As the series progresses, he hones his powers, developing the ability to open portals for transportation purposes and to travel across the multiverse, and becomes Vibe, though he eventually chooses to take a metahuman cure to remove his powers and use his inventions to become Mecha-Vibe.
 Additionally, Valdes portrays several villainous doppelgangers of Ramon throughout The Flash, such as Reverb of Earth-2 and Echo of Earth-19.
 Ramon also appears in the live-action TV series Legends of Tomorrow and Supergirl, the live-action web series Chronicles of Cisco: Entry 0419, and the animated web series Vixen.
 Ramon and his Earth-X doppelganger appear in the animated web series Freedom Fighters: The Ray.

Film
A villainous, alternate universe incarnation of Vibe named Breakdance appears in Justice League: Crisis on Two Earths, voiced by Carlos Alazraqui. He is a member of the Crime Syndicate of America serving under Owlman.

Video games
 Vibe appears as playable character in Lego Batman 3: Beyond Gotham, voiced by Dee Bradley Baker.
 The Arrowverse incarnation of Vibe appears as a playable character in Lego DC Super-Villains as part of the "DC TV Super-Heroes" DLC pack.

Miscellaneous 
Vibe makes background appearances in DC Super Hero Girls as a student of Super Hero High.

References

External links
 DCU Guide: Vibe (Cisco Ramone)
 DCU Guide: Hardline (Armando Ramone),

Characters created by Chuck Patton
Characters created by Gerry Conway
Comics characters introduced in 1984
DC Comics male superheroes
DC Comics characters who can teleport 
DC Comics metahumans
DC Comics orphans
Fictional characters from Detroit
Fictional characters who can manipulate sound
Fictional characters with dimensional travel abilities
Fictional characters with precognition
Fictional characters with retrocognition
Fictional dancers
Fictional Hispanic and Latino American people
Latin American superheroes
Fictional hackers